Woods Crossroads (also called Woods Cross Roads) is an unincorporated community in Gloucester County, in the U. S. state of Virginia. Woods Crossroads has a post office with ZIP code 23190.

References

Unincorporated communities in Virginia
Unincorporated communities in Gloucester County, Virginia